The 2007 Leinster Minor Football Championship is the Minor "knockout" competition in the game of football played in the province of Leinster in Ireland. The series of games are organised by the Leinster GAA.

Draw

First round

MFC Qualifiers Round 1

MFC Qualifiers Round 2

Last 8

Semi-final

Final

See also

References

Leinster Minor Football Championship
Leinster Minor Football Championship